Banana virus X (BVX) is a plant virus that infects members of the genus Musa. Its genome is about 2,900 nucleotides in length and contains five open reading frames that encode for a replication-associated protein, a movement-associated triple gene block and a capsid protein. A polyvalent degenerate oligonucleotide reverse transcription polymerase chain reaction (PDO-RT-PCR) assay has been developed to detect BVX nucleic acid in infected leaves. The virus was originally discovered in Guadeloupe.

References

Viral plant pathogens and diseases
Banana diseases